The Book of Caverns is an important ancient Egyptian netherworld book of the New Kingdom. Like all other netherworld books, it is also attested on the inside of kings’ tombs for the benefit of the deceased. It describes the journey of the sun god Ra through the six caverns of the underworld, focusing on the interaction between the sun god and the inhabitants of the netherworld, including rewards for the righteous and punishments for the enemies of the worldly order, those who fail their judgment in the afterlife.  The Book of Caverns is one of the best sources of information about the Egyptian concept of hell.

The Book of Caverns originated in the 13th century BC in the Ramesside Period. The earliest known version of this work is on the left hand wall of the Osireion in Abydos.  Later it appears in the tomb of Ramesses IV in the Valley of the Kings. This appearance was already recorded by the founding father of Egyptology Jean François Champollion in his letters from Egypt.

Content
Like the two earlier Great Netherworld Books, the Book of Caverns first of all describes the journey of the sun god (Ra) from the western horizon to the eastern horizon through the underworld, the divine creatures that he meets, and his interaction with them. Important landmarks on his journey are 
 the caverns of the "justified" deceased, now divine creatures (1st and 2nd tableau); 
 the cavern of Osiris’s corpse and the sun god's own two divine bodies (3rd tableau); and
 the exit of the underworld for the sunrise (final tableau). 
During his journey, the sun god passes over the caverns of Hell, in which the enemies of the world order (the enemies of Ra and Osiris) are being destroyed. The Book of Caverns also gives some hints on the imagined topographical structure of the underworld.

Structure

The Book of Caverns has no ancient title. It is not divided into hours of the night as other netherworld books are. Instead, the book contains seven great scene tableaus with altogether approximately 80 different scenes. It is divided into two parts with three tableaus each, plus a final tableau.

The Book of Caverns is much more literary that other funerary books from the New Kingdom, such as the Amduat or the Book of Gates. It does not have as many pictures as the other books, but it contains much more text.

History
Today we know of 13 text witnesses of the Book of Caverns:

The first known almost complete version of The Book of Caverns that only has its upper register damaged was located in the Osireion. It was discovered by archaeologists Flinders Petrie and Margaret Murray who were excavating the site in 1902 through 1903. The Book of Caverns was found directly across from the Book of Gates within the entrance passage on the left wall.

Ramesses IV was the first to use Book of Caverns in his tomb.  The first (and last) almost complete copy in the Valley of the Kings is the version in the tomb of Ramesses VI. Here it appears opposite the Book of Gates in the front of the tomb, similar to the layout in the Osireion. The passages of the book were written all over the walls of the tomb completely covering it in text.

Translation
The first translation of some sentences of the Book of Caverns from the tomb of Ramesses VI were given by Ippolito Rosellini in 1836. Not much later, Jean François Champollion wrote about the Book of Caverns from this tomb providing some translations.

Scholars, however, were not greatly interested in the book until about a century later when the second complete version of the text was discovered in the Osireion. In 1933 Henri Frankfort published the first complete translation of the book with the help of Adriaan de Buck based on this version. Between 1942 and 1945, Alexandre Piankoff published a French translation of the book, followed by a translation into German by Erik Hornung in 1972. A second English translation is a translation of Hornung’s book from German into English.

The latest translation was published by the German scholar Daniel Werning, based on a new text critical edition.

References

Bibliography
 
  
 
  (combining separate articles in the journal Bulletin de l’Institut français d’Archéologie orientale Nr. XLI, XLII, XLIII und XLV.' (online)).

External links 

 Taylor Ray Ellison, The Book of Caverns (with many pictures and detailed information on the individual tableaus) 
 Research project on the content of Book of Caverns and the topography of the ancient Egyptian underworld at the Excellence Cluster Topoi. The Formation and Transformation of Space and Knowledge in Ancient Civilizations, Berlin (Germany) [in English].
 Pictures of text witnesses in the kings' tombs: Theban Mapping Project (online).
 List of deities in the Book of Caverns, from the website Comparative Religion of Shamanism / Shamanhood / Shamanship

13th-century BC literature
Ancient Egyptian funerary texts
Egyptian mythology